Factitious disorder imposed on self, also known as Munchausen syndrome, is a factitious disorder in which those affected feign or induce disease, illness, injury, abuse, or psychological trauma to draw attention, sympathy, or reassurance to themselves. Munchausen syndrome fits within the subclass of factitious disorder with predominantly physical signs and symptoms, but patients also have a history of recurrent hospitalization, travelling, and dramatic, extremely improbable tales of their past experiences. The condition derives its name from the fictional character Baron Munchausen.

Factitious disorder imposed on self is related to factitious disorder imposed on another, which refers to the abuse of another person, typically a child, in order to seek attention or sympathy for the abuser. This is considered “Munchausen by proxy” and the drive to create symptoms for the victim can result in unnecessary and costly diagnostic or corrective procedures.

Signs and symptoms
In factitious disorder imposed on self, the affected person exaggerates or creates symptoms of illnesses in themselves to gain examination, treatment, attention, sympathy or comfort from medical personnel. It often involves elements of victim playing and attention seeking. In some extreme cases, people with Munchausen syndrome are highly knowledgeable about the practice of medicine and are able to produce symptoms that result in lengthy and costly medical analysis, prolonged hospital stays, and unnecessary operations. The role of patient is a familiar and comforting one, and it fills a psychological need in people with this syndrome. This disorder is distinct from hypochondriasis and other somatoform disorders in that those with the latter do not intentionally produce their somatic symptoms. Factitious disorder is distinct from malingering in that people with factitious disorder imposed on self do not fabricate symptoms for material gain such as financial compensation, absence from work, or access to drugs.

The exact cause of factitious disorder is not known, but researchers believe both biological and psychological factors play a role in the development of this disorder. Risk factors for developing factitious disorder may include childhood traumas, growing up with parents/caretakers who were emotionally unavailable due to illness or emotional problems, a serious illness as a child, failed aspirations to work in the medical field, personality disorders, and low self-esteem. While there are no reliable statistics regarding the number of people in the United States who have factitious disorder, FD is believed to be most common in mothers having the above risk factors. Those with a history of working in healthcare are also at greater risk of developing it.

Arrhythmogenic Munchausen syndrome describes individuals who simulate or stimulate cardiac arrhythmias to gain medical attention.

A related behavior called factitious disorder imposed on another has been documented in the parent or guardian of a child or the owner of a pet animal. The adult ensures that their child will experience some medical condition, therefore compelling the child to suffer through treatments and spend a significant portion during youth in hospitals. Furthermore, a disease may actually be initiated in the child by the parent or guardian. This condition is considered distinct from Munchausen syndrome. There is growing consensus in the pediatric community that this disorder should be renamed "medical abuse" to highlight the harm caused by the deception and to make it less likely that the sufferer can use a psychiatric defense when harm is done.

Diagnosis
Due to the behaviors involved, diagnosing factitious disorder is very difficult. If the healthcare provider finds no physical reason for the symptoms, they may refer the person to a psychiatrist or psychologist (mental health professionals who are specially trained to diagnose and treat mental illnesses). Psychiatrists and psychologists use thorough history, physical examinations, laboratory tests, imagery, and psychological testing to evaluate a person for physical and mental conditions. Once the person's history has been thoroughly evaluated, diagnosing factitious disorder imposed on self requires a clinical assessment. Clinicians should be aware that those presenting with symptoms (or persons reporting for that person) may exaggerate, and caution should be taken to ensure there is evidence for a diagnosis. Lab tests may be required, including complete blood count (CBC), urine toxicology, drug levels from blood, cultures, coagulation tests, assays for thyroid function, or DNA typing. In some cases CT scan, magnetic resonance imaging, psychological testing, electroencephalography, or electrocardiography may also be employed. A summary of more common and reported cases of factitious disorder (Munchausen syndrome), and the laboratory tests used to differentiate these from physical disease is provided below:

There are several criteria that together may point to factitious disorder, including frequent hospitalizations, knowledge of several illnesses, frequently requesting medication such as pain killers, openness to extensive surgery, few or no visitors during hospitalizations, and exaggerated or fabricated stories about several medical problems. Factitious disorder should not be confused with hypochondria, as people with factitious disorder syndrome do not really believe they are sick; they only want to be sick, and thus fabricate the symptoms of an illness. It is also not the same as pretending to be sick for personal benefit such as being excused from work or school.

People may fake their symptoms in multiple ways. Other than making up past medical histories and faking illnesses, people might inflict harm on themselves by consuming laxatives or other substances, self-inflicting injury to induce bleeding, and altering laboratory samples". Many of these conditions do not have clearly observable or diagnostic symptoms and sometimes the syndrome will go undetected because patients will fabricate identities when visiting the hospital several times. Factitious disorder has several complications, as these people will go to great lengths to fake their illness. Severe health problems, serious injuries, loss of limbs or organs, and even death are possible complications.

Treatment
Because there is uncertainty in treating suspected factitious disorder imposed on self, some advocate that health care providers first explicitly rule out the possibility that the person has another early-stage disease. Then they may take a careful history and seek medical records to look for early deprivation, childhood abuse, or mental illness. If a person is at risk to themself, psychiatric hospitalization may be initiated.

Healthcare providers may consider working with mental health specialists to help treat the underlying mood or other disorder as well as to avoid countertransference. Therapeutic and medical treatment may center on the underlying psychiatric disorder: a mood disorder, an anxiety disorder, or borderline personality disorder. The patient's prognosis depends upon the category under which the underlying disorder falls; depression and anxiety, for example, generally respond well to medication or cognitive behavioral therapy, whereas borderline personality disorder, like all personality disorders, is presumed to be pervasive and more stable over time, and thus offers a worse prognosis.

People affected may have multiple scars on their abdomen due to repeated "emergency" operations.

History
The name "Munchausen syndrome" derives from Baron Munchausen, a literary character loosely based on the German nobleman Hieronymus Karl Friedrich, Freiherr von Münchhausen (1720–1797). The historical baron became a well-known storyteller in the late 18th century for entertaining dinner guests with tales about his adventures during the Russo-Turkish War. In 1785, German-born writer and con artist Rudolf Erich Raspe anonymously published a book in which a heavily fictionalized version of "Baron Munchausen" tells many fantastic and impossible stories about himself. Raspe's Munchausen became a sensation, establishing a literary exemplar of a bombastic liar or exaggerator.

In 1951, Richard Asher was the first to describe a pattern of self-harm, wherein individuals fabricated histories, signs, and symptoms of illness. Remembering Baron Munchausen, Asher named this condition Munchausen's Syndrome in his article in The Lancet in February 1951, quoted in his obituary in the British Medical Journal:

Asher's nomenclature sparked some controversy, with medical authorities debating the appropriateness of the name for about fifty years. While Asher was praised for bringing cases of factitious disorder to light, participants in the debate objected variously that a literary allusion was inappropriate given the seriousness of the disease; that its use of the anglicized spelling "Munchausen" showed poor form; that the name linked the disease with the real-life Münchhausen, who did not have it; and that the name's connection to works of humor and fantasy, and to the essentially ridiculous character of the fictional Baron Munchausen, was disrespectful to patients with the disorder.

Originally, this term was used for all factitious disorders. Now, however, in the DSM-5, "Munchausen syndrome" and "Munchausen by proxy" have been replaced with "factitious disorder imposed on self" and "factitious disorder imposed on another" respectively.

Munchausen by Internet 
Munchausen by Internet is a term describing the pattern of behavior in factitious disorder imposed on self, wherein those affected feign illnesses in online venues. It has been described in medical literature as a manifestation of factitious disorder imposed on self. Reports of users who deceive Internet forum participants by portraying themselves as gravely ill or as victims of violence first appeared in the 1990s due to the relative newness of Internet communications. The specific internet pattern was named "Münchausen by Internet" in 1998 by psychiatrist Marc Feldman. New Zealand PC World Magazine called Munchausen by Internet "cybermunch", and those who posed online "cybermunchers".

A person may attempt to gain sympathy from a group whose sole reason for existence is to support others. Some have speculated that health care professionals, with their limited time, greater medical knowledge, and tendency to be more skeptical in their diagnoses, may be less likely to provide that support.

In an article published in The Guardian, Steve Jones, speculated that the anonymity of the Internet impedes people's abilities to realize when someone is lying. Online interaction has only been possible since the 1980s, steadily growing over the years.

When discovered, forum members are frequently banned from some online forums. Because no money is exchanged and laws are rarely broken, there is little legal recourse to take upon discovery of someone faking illness.

Such dramatic situations can polarize online communities. Members may feel ashamed for believing elaborate lies, while others remain staunch supporters. Feldman admits that an element of sadism may be evident in some of the more egregious abuses of trust.

Other perpetrators react by issuing general accusations of dishonesty to everyone, following the exposure of such fabrications. The support groups themselves often bar discussion about the fraudulent perpetrator, in order to avoid further argument and negativity. Many forums do not recover, often splintering or shutting down.

In 2004, members of the blog hosting service LiveJournal established a forum dedicated to investigating cases of members of online communities dying—sometimes while online. In 2007 The LiveJournal forum reported that, of the deaths reported to them, about 10% were real.

See also

 Hypochondriasis
 Psychosomatic illness
 Sickened, an autobiography by Julie Gregory

References

Bibliography

External links 

Article in Discover magazine, July 1993, by Abigail Zuger

Forensic psychology
Factitious disorders
Psychopathological syndromes
Baron Munchausen